Teeth and Tissue is the second studio album by Canadian rock band Headstones.

Track listing

Nominations
At the Juno Awards of 1996, Teeth and Tissue was nominated for Best Rock Album.

Certifications
On June 13, 1997, Teeth and Tissue was certified gold by Music Canada.

Chart performance

References

1995 albums
Headstones (band) albums
MCA Records albums
Albums recorded at Metalworks Studios